The Potsdam Gate was one of the western gates of the Berlin Customs Wall, south of the still-standing Brandenburg Gate. It was originally constructed in 1734, and then rebuilt in 1824 as a neoclassic imposing gateway. It was one of the few gates that were left when the Customs Wall was demolished (1867–1870) but it suffered severe damage during the bombing of Berlin in World War II (1943–1945). Its remains were demolished in 1961, when the Berlin Wall was erected.

See also
Potsdamer Platz

References

Buildings and structures in Mitte
Infrastructure completed in 1734
Gates in Germany
Monuments and memorials in Berlin
Neoclassical architecture in Berlin 
Demolished buildings and structures in Germany